Jill Moffatt (born February 9, 1993) is a Canadian rower.

Career
At the 2019 World Rowing Championships, Moffatt along with partner Jennifer Casson finished eighth in the women's lightweight double sculls, finishing one spot out of qualifying the boat for the 2020 Olympics. However, in 2021, New Zealand declined its quota place, allowing the pair to qualify for the games.

In June 2021, Moffatt was named to Canada's 2020 Olympic team in the women's lightweight double sculls with partner Jennifer Casson.

References

1993 births
Canadian female rowers
Living people
Rowers at the 2020 Summer Olympics
21st-century Canadian women